Melenita de oro (English language: Hair of Gold) is a 1923 silent Argentine film directed and written by José A. Ferreyra. The film premiered on 4 June 1923 in Buenos Aires.

Cast
 Álvaro Escobar
 Jorge Lafuente
 Lidia Liss
 José Plá

External links
 

1923 films
1920s Spanish-language films
Argentine black-and-white films
Argentine silent films
Tango films
Films directed by José A. Ferreyra